

2015

Slovakia competed at the 2015 UCI Track Cycling World Championships in Saint-Quentin-en-Yvelines at the Vélodrome de Saint-Quentin-en-Yvelines from 18–22 February 2015. A team of 1 cyclists (1 women, 0 men) was announced to represent the country in the event.

Results

Women

Sources

2016 

Slovakia competed at the 2016 UCI Track Cycling World Championships at the Lee Valley VeloPark in London, United Kingdom from 2–4 March 2016. A team of 1 cyclists (1 women, 0 men) was announced to represent the country in the event.

Results

Women

Sources

References

Nations at the UCI Track Cycling World Championships
Slovakia at cycling events